Real Rieti Calcio a 5 is a futsal club based in Rieti, Lazio, Italy.

Players and coaches

Famous players
 Michele Miarelli
 Marcio Forte
 Massimo De Luca
 Diego Giustozzi

External links
 UEFA profile
 Divisione Calcio a 5

Futsal clubs in Italy
Sport in Lazio
1999 establishments in Italy
Futsal clubs established in 1999
Rieti